Powerful is the third studio album by American rapper Young Noble. It was released on September 13, 2016, through Outlaw Recordz. It features guest appearances from Hussein Fatal, Dirty Bert of Jerzey Mob, Mass tha Villain, Aktual, Deuce Deuce of Concrete Mob, stic.man of Dead Prez, EDIDON and Munch Ali.

Track listing

References

External links 
 OutlawzMedia.net Official Website
 
 
 
 

2016 albums
Young Noble albums